Harasewychia is a genus of sea snails, marine gastropod mollusks in the family Fasciolariidae, the spindle snails, the tulip snails and their allies.

Species
Species within the genus Harasewychia include:

 Harasewychia harasewychi Petuch, 1987

References

Fasciolariidae
Monotypic gastropod genera